Thomas Ungar (born 16 May 1931) is an Austrian conductor, music educator and lecturer..

Life and career 

From 1973, he was professor at the State University of Music and Performing Arts Stuttgart. He has been a guest conductor in Europe and the US and has made numerous radio, television and record recordings. These include the Landesjugendorchester Baden-Württemberg, the Mozarteum Orchestra Salzburg and many others.

Students 
 Bernd Ruf
 Christoph Adt
 Christian Fitzner
 Ivo Hentschel
 Gerhard Jenemann
 Johannes Klumpp
 Matthias Manasi
 Veronika Stoertzenbach

References

External links 
 
 

1931 births
Living people
Musicians from Budapest
Austrian conductors (music)
Music directors
Austrian music educators